Carex acocksii is a tussock-forming species of perennial sedge in the family Cyperaceae. It is native to the Cape Provinces area of South Africa.

See also
List of Carex species

References

acocksii
Plants described in 1997
Flora of the Cape Provinces